Elite Towers is a cluster of 34 towers located in the City of Arabia in Dubai, United Arab Emirates.  Currently, there are a few towers that are under construction; all others are approved.  The tallest tower in the complex has a height of 290 m (951 ft). The number of floors for the towers range from 30 to 60.  The towers in the complex consist of residential, office and hotel towers.  The whole complex is a development by Ilyas and Mustafa Galadari Group.

Towers
The complex consists of 34 skyscrapers:

* Table entries without text indicate that information regarding building heights, and/or use has not yet been released.

See also
List of tallest buildings in Dubai

References

External links
Elite Towers Official website
Elite Towers on Emporis

Residential skyscrapers in Dubai
Buildings and structures under construction in Dubai
Proposed buildings and structures in Dubai